The dogface witch eel (Facciolella equatorialis) is an eel in the family Nettastomatidae (duckbill/witch eels). It was described by Charles Henry Gilbert in 1891. It is a marine, deep water-dwelling eel which is known from the eastern central Pacific Ocean, including Point Conception, California, USA; Panama, Guadalupe, and the Galapagos Islands. The fish is known to dwell at an approximate depth of 734 meters. Males can reach a maximum total length of 90 centimetres.

The dogface witch eel's diet consists primarily of small deep-water crustaceans.

References

Nettastomatidae
Fish described in 1891